Agaraea uniformis is a moth of the family Erebidae. It was described by George Hampson in 1898. It is found in Brazil.

References

Moths described in 1898
Phaegopterina
Moths of South America